Dirk Lellek (3 January 1964 – 21 April 2016) was a German professional footballer who played as a defender.

References

1964 births
2016 deaths
German footballers
Association football defenders
SV Werder Bremen players
SV Werder Bremen II players
Hertha BSC players
Viktoria Aschaffenburg players
VfB Oldenburg players
Eintracht Braunschweig players
VfL Osnabrück players
FC Basel players
SV Wilhelmshaven players
Kickers Emden players
Bundesliga players
2. Bundesliga players
Swiss Super League players
German expatriate footballers
Expatriate footballers in Switzerland
German expatriate sportspeople in Switzerland
Footballers from Bremen